Looe Key is a coral reef located within the Florida Keys National Marine Sanctuary. It lies to the south of Big Pine Key. This reef is within a Sanctuary Preservation Area (SPA). Part of Looe Key is designated as "Research Only," an area which protects some of the patch reefs landward of the main reef.

The reef is named after , which ran aground on the reef and sank in 1744.

In 1997, the University paid $3.76 million in natural resource damage claims to National Oceanic and Atmospheric Administration (NOAA). In 1999, a restoration project involving placement of limestone boulders, pouring of concrete, and reintroduction of benthic species was undertaken by NOAA and its subcontractors.

Gallery

References

 NOAA National Marine Sanctuary Maps, Florida Keys East
 NOAA Website on Looe Key
 NOAA Navigational Chart 11445

External links
 Barbara H. Lidz, Christopher D. Reich, and Eugene A. Shinn, Systematic Mapping of Bedrock and Habitats along the Florida Reef Tract—Central Key Largo to Halfmoon Shoal (Gulf of Mexico). USGS Professional Paper 1751. Tile 6, Looe Key
 Franko's Florida Keys Dive & Guide Map
 Benthic Habitat Map

Coral reefs of the Florida Keys